Dorcadion shirvanicum is a species of beetle in the family Cerambycidae. It was described by Bogatschew in 1934. It is known from Azerbaijan.

Species
 Dorcadion shirvanicum azerbajdzhanicum Plavilstshikov, 1937
 Dorcadion shirvanicum shirvanicum Bogatschew, 1934

References

shirvanicum
Beetles described in 1934